Nels Johnson (April 30, 1896 – December 2, 1958) was a justice of the North Dakota Supreme Court from April 1, 1954 to December 2, 1958.

Born in Akrens, Iceland, Johnson was brought to the United States in 1900.

References

Justices of the North Dakota Supreme Court
1896 births
1958 deaths
Icelandic emigrants to the United States
20th-century American judges